Volodymyr Andriyovych Shepelyev (born 1 June 1997) is a Ukrainian professional footballer who plays as a midfielder for Dynamo Kyiv.

Career

Club
Shepelyev is a product of the FC Chornomorets Odesa and FC Dynamo Kyiv academy systems. His first trainers were Serhiy Husyev and Pavlo Kikot.

He made his debut in the Ukrainian Premier League for Dynamo on 25 February 2017 against FC Zorya Luhansk.

International
Shepelyev made his national team debut for Ukraine on 6 June 2017 at Merkur Arena in Graz, in a 1–0 friendly defeat to Malta.

Career statistics

Club

International

Honours

Club
Dynamo Kyiv
Ukrainian Super Cup: 2018
 Ukrainian Cup: 2019–20

References

External links 

1997 births
Living people
Ukrainian footballers
Association football midfielders
Ukraine youth international footballers
Ukraine under-21 international footballers
Ukraine international footballers
FC Dynamo Kyiv players
Ukrainian Premier League players
Sportspeople from Odesa Oblast